The white-spotted nudibranch (Doriopsilla capensis)  is a species of sea slug, a dorid nudibranch. It is a marine gastropod mollusc in the family Dendrodorididae.

Distribution
This species has so far only been found around the southern African coast off the Atlantic side of the Cape Peninsula in 10–30 m. It is probably endemic.

Description
The white-spotted nudibranch has a translucent white- to tan-coloured body, which may have a bluish tinge. The body is covered with white protuberances. The margin is opaque white. The perfoliate rhinophores are cream-coloured as is the gill rosette. It may reach a total length of 30 mm.

Ecology
This species has been found among sponges.

References

External links 

Dendrodorididae